Cattle Creek may refer to:

Australia
 Cattle Creek (New South Wales), a partly perennial stream of the Hunter River catchment
 Cattle Creek, Queensland (North Burnett Region), a locality
 Cattle Creek, Queensland (Toowoomba Region), a locality
 Cattle Creek Station, part of Wave Hill Station, Northern Territory

United States
 Cattle Creek, Colorado, a census-designated place
 Cattle Creek Campground, a historic church campground and national historic district near Rowesville, South Carolina